The Criminal Justice Act (Northern Ireland) 1966 (c 20) (NI) is an Act of the Parliament of Northern Ireland. It makes similar provision to the Homicide Act 1957 and the Suicide Act 1961 for Northern Ireland.

Part I – Provisions as to criminal responsibility

Section 1
The definition of "insane person" in this section is applied by section 30 of the Criminal Appeal (Northern Ireland) Act 1980.

Part II – Homicide and suicide

Section 9
This section was partially repealed by the Children and Young Persons Act (Northern Ireland) 1968 (c 34) (NI). As to section 9(2) of this Act, see section 73(1) of that Act.

This section was repealed by section 31(3) of, and Schedule 5 to, the Northern Ireland (Emergency Provisions) Act 1973.

Section 10
This section created the offence of capital murder.

This section was repealed by section 31(3) of, and Schedule 5 to, the Northern Ireland (Emergency Provisions) Act 1973.

Section 11
This section was repealed by section 31(3) of, and Schedule 5 to, the Northern Ireland (Emergency Provisions) Act 1973.

Section 13 – Criminal liability for complicity in another's suicide
This section is amended by section 60 of the Coroners and Justice Act 2009

Section 13A – Acts capable of encouraging or assisting
This section was inserted by section 60(4) of the Coroners and Justice Act 2009.

Section 13B – Course of conduct
This section was inserted by section 60(4) of the Coroners and Justice Act 2009.

Section 14 – Suicide pacts
This section creates the partial defence of suicide pact which reduces murder to manslaughter.

Part III
Sections 15 to 20 and 22 were repealed by 1968 c 21.

Section 16
This section related to the disposal of an appeal against a verdict of not guilty on the ground of insanity.

The words from "in relation to" onwards, in section 16(3), were repealed by section 103 of, and Part III of Schedule 7 to, the Criminal Justice Act 1967.

Section 16(5) was inserted by section 98(6) of, and paragraph 41 of Schedule 4 to, the Criminal Justice Act 1967.

Section 17
See paragraph 9 of Schedule 4 to the Criminal Justice Act 1967.

Section 21
This section was repealed by section 51(2) of, and Schedule 5 to Criminal Appeal (Northern Ireland) Act 1980.

Part IV – General

Section 23 – Short title
Section 23(2) was repealed by SLR 1973.

Schedule 1
This Schedule was repealed by 1968 c 21.

Schedule 2
This Schedule was partially repealed by the Grand Jury (Abolition) Act (Northern Ireland) 1969 (c 15) (NI)

This Schedule was repealed by section 51(2) of, and Schedule 5 to Criminal Appeal (Northern Ireland) Act 1980.

See also
Criminal Justice Act

References

External links

Criminal Justice Act (Northern Ireland) 1966, as amended from the National Archives.

Acts of the Parliament of Northern Ireland 1966
Criminal law of Northern Ireland
Homicide
Suicide in the United Kingdom